Daning County is a county in the southwest of Shanxi province, China, bordering Shaanxi province to the west. It is under the administration of Linfen.

History 

The approximate area of present-day Daning County was first incorporated under the Northern Wei.

Daning County itself was formally incorporated in 561 CE, during the Northern Zhou.

Republic of China 
Upon the abolition of the circuit system, Daning County was administered directly by the province.

People's Republic of China 
The county was briefly abolished from 1958 to 1961. In 1970, Linfen Prefecture was restored, and Daning County was placed under its administration.

Geography 

Climate

Administrative divisions 
Daning County administers two towns and four townships.

Towns 

Townships 

Demographics 
In the 2000 Chinese Census, the county's population totaled 56,037. A 1997 estimate placed the population at around 60,000 people.

References

County-level divisions of Shanxi
Linfen